Hadar HaCarmel ( lit. "Splendor of the Carmel"; or simply known as the neighbourhood of Hadar , الهدار in Arabic) is a district of Haifa, Israel. Located on the northern slope of Mount Carmel between the upper and lower city overlooking the Port of Haifa and Haifa Bay, it was once the commercial center of Haifa.

Etymology
The name of the neighborhood is derived from a verse in Isaiah .

History

Hadar HaCarmel was founded before World War I. Shmuel Pevzner was one of the founders of the neighborhood and head of its development committee in 1922-1927.

By 1944, most of Haifa's 66,000 Jewish residents lived in the district. Haifa's city hall, courthouse and government buildings were located in Hadar, but relocated to the lower city (Downtown) in the turn of the 21st century.

Hadar has historically been characterized as a Jewish immigrant neighbourhood with many Holocaust survivors settled in the area, and in the early 1990s when many newcomers from the former Soviet Union were first absorbed there.

Landmarks
The Technion was established in Hadar, and was located there until the new Kiryat HaTechnion ("Technion City") campus was inaugurated in Nave Sha'anan in the late 1970s. The old historic building, dating from 1912, is now a hands-on science museum, the Israel National Museum of Science, Technology, and Space. The Carmelit, Israel's only subway, runs from Carmel Center to Downtown's Paris Square via Hadar HaCarmel, and three of the line's six stations are located in the district. The neighborhood has many Bauhaus buildings designed by German-Jewish architects who settled in Mandatory Palestine after fleeing the Nazis. Hadar is close to Downtown's Wadi Nisnas landmarks, such as Beit HaGefen, an Arab–Jewish cultural center and AlMeidan Arab-language Theater.

Demography
Hadar HaCarmel has roughly 37,200 residents, accounting for 14% of Haifa's population. It is a neighborhood in flux with a large percentage of new immigrants from the former Soviet Union.

According to the official division by the Haifa municipality, Hadar HaCarmel consists of four sub-districts: Hadar West, Hadar East, Central Hadar and Upper Hadar. Hadar West's population is about 62% Arab, there are also a significant number of wealthy Christian Arabs in Abbas neighbourhood in the Hadar West. The Baháʼí Faith's Shrine of the Báb and Universal House of Justice are located in this sub-district, where nearby many Baháʼís from around the world reside. Upper Hadar, where the Bnai Zion Medical Center is located, is a very heterogeneous community. Central Hadar contains many of Haifa's architectural, cultural and historical landmarks including Haifa Theater, Madatech - the National Science Museum, Binyamin Park and Talpiot Market; today, its population is largely Russian-speaking, making it Haifa's most distinct Russian immigrant neighbourhood, Central Hadar contains also a significant number of Arabs (Muslims and Christians) in H'aneviim, Herzliya neighborhoods and Masada Street. Hadar East is divided into three smaller neighborhoods - Geula, Ramat Viznitz and Yalag, the two former today being largely Haredi and the latter predominantly Arab and Russian.

References

See also

Neighborhoods of Haifa
Wadi Nisnas

Arab Israeli culture in Haifa
Arab localities in Israel
Arab Christian communities in Israel
Neighborhoods of Haifa
Mount Carmel
Russian-Jewish culture in Israel